The 1938 Howard Bulldogs football team was an American football team that represented Howard College (now known as the Samford University) as a member of the Dixie Conference during the 1938 college football season. In their fourth year under head coach Billy Bancroft, the team compiled a 2–5 record.

Schedule

References

Howard
Samford Bulldogs football seasons
Howard Bulldogs football